Bamondi Union is a union parishad of Gangni Upazila, in Meherpur District, Khulna Division of Bangladesh. There are 15 villages and 10 mouzas in the union.

References

External links
 

Unions of Gangni Upazila
Unions of Meherpur District
Unions of Khulna Division